Wafu or WAFU may refer to:

 West African Football Union
WAFU Nations Cup
 Wafu dressing, a Japanese-style salad dressing
 WAFU (slang), a term for members of the Fleet Air Arm

See also